USS El Paso (AKA-117/LKA-117) is a Charleston-class amphibious cargo ship named after the city of El Paso, Texas. She served as a commissioned ship for 24 years and three months.

History
She was laid down as AKA-117 at the Newport News Shipbuilding and Dry Dock Company in Newport News, Virginia, on October 22, 1968. Redesignated LKA-117 on January 1, 1969, she was launched on May 17, 1969 and commissioned on January 17, 1970.

El Paso was not involved in the Vietnam War. She was home-ported at the Naval Operating Base, Norfolk, Virginia. Her operations included embarking a Marine Amphibious Ready Group and transporting the MARG to the Mediterranean Sea for a six month deployment. In 1979 she deployed to the Mediterranean and eventually redirected to the Indian Ocean and Diego Garcia during the Iran Hostage conflict. For that she was awarded the Navy Expeditionary Medal. In 1993 she again deployed to the Indian Ocean and the Persian Gulf to participate in Operation Restore Hope in Somalia. She was decommissioned on April 21, 1994, and is berthed at the Naval Inactive Ship Maintenance Facility in Philadelphia, Pennsylvania. The ship earned several additional awards and campaign ribbons for her service.

She has had several noteworthy commanding officers.

Among them are CAPT Edward Clexton, Jr, from March 1979 thru August 1980. During his command, the crew were awarded the Navy Expeditionary Medal for the Iran Hostage Crisis. CAPT Clexton went to command USS Dwight D Eisenhower (CVN-69). VADM Clexton retired in 1993 as Deputy CINCUSNAVEUR.

Also noteworthy is Roy Cash, nephew of singer Johnny Cash and father of Miss America 1987 winner Kellye Cash, served as her captain from August 1985 to March 1987.

References

External links

51 Years of AKAs: A Brief History of the Attack Cargo Ship

 

Charleston-class amphibious cargo ships
Cold War amphibious warfare vessels of the United States
USS El Paso (LKA-117)
1969 ships
Ships built in Newport News, Virginia